Wish You Were Here is the twelfth studio album from Australian vocal group The Ten Tenors, released in April 2017. The album is a "homage" to many great artists who have deceased. The Ten Tenors say "This isn’t intended to be sombre, rather a celebration of the happiness these people brought to the world. Put simply, to all the lost artists, we wish you were here".
In an interview with Today show on 10 April, the band say it was inspired by David Bowie's death.

The album was promoted with a national tour across August 2017  and peaked at number 18 on the ARIA Charts.

Track listing

Charts

Release history

References

2017 albums
The Ten Tenors albums
Sony Music Australia albums